Scoot is a Singaporean low-cost airline owned by Singapore Airlines. It launched flights in 2012 on medium and long-haul routes from Singapore. 
Scoot began operating Tigerair's routes following their merger on 25 July 2017. The following destinations are served or planned:

List

References

Singapore Airlines
Lists of airline destinations